Florian Weichert (born January 28, 1968) is a German former footballer.

External links

1968 births
Living people
German footballers
East German footballers
FC Hansa Rostock players
Hamburger SV players
Dynamo Dresden players
1. FC Lokomotive Leipzig players
Sportspeople from Rostock
Bundesliga players
2. Bundesliga players
DDR-Oberliga players
Association football forwards
Footballers from Mecklenburg-Western Pomerania